Chaetogyne is a genus of bristle flies in the family Tachinidae. There are at least three described species in Chaetogyne.

Distribution
Brazil

Species
Chaetogyne analis Curran, 1937
Chaetogyne vexans (Wiedemann, 1830)
Chaetogyne zoae Toma, 2001

References

Dexiinae
Taxa named by Friedrich Moritz Brauer
Taxa named by Julius von Bergenstamm
Tachinidae genera
Diptera of South America